The 2020–21 Clemson Tigers women's basketball team represented Clemson University during the 2020–21 college basketball season. The Tigers were led by third year head coach Amanda Butler. The Tigers, members of the Atlantic Coast Conference, played their home games at Littlejohn Coliseum.

The Tigers finished the season 12–14 and 5–12 in ACC play to finish in eleventh place. In the ACC tournament, they defeated Notre Dame in the Second Round before losing to Georgia Tech in the Quarterfinals. They received an at-large bid to the WNIT. They defeated Ohio in the First Round before losing to Delaware in the Second Round to end their season.

Previous season
The Tigers finished the 2019–20 season 8–23, 3–15 in ACC play to finish in fourteenth place. They lost to Boston College in the Second Round of the ACC tournament. The NCAA tournament and WNIT were cancelled due to the COVID-19 outbreak.

After the season, Kobi Thornton was drafted in the third round of the WNBA draft (27th overall) by the Atlanta Dream.

Offseason

Departures

2020 recruiting class

Source:

Roster
Source:

Schedule
Source: 

|-
!colspan=9 style="background:#522D80; color:#F66733;"| Non-conference regular season

|-
!colspan=9 style="background:#522D80; color:#F66733;"| Conference regular season

|-
!colspan=9 style="background:#522D80; color:#F66733;"| ACC Women's Tournament

|-
!colspan=12 style="background:#522D80; color:#F66733;" |WNIT

Rankings

See also
 2020–21 Clemson Tigers men's basketball team

References

Clemson Tigers women's basketball seasons
Clemson
Clemson Tigers
Clemson Tigers
Clemson